Rouen Airport or Aéroport de Rouen - Vallée de Seine  is an airport located in Boos and 10 km southeast of Rouen, both communes of the Seine-Maritime département in the Normandy région of France.

Airlines and destinations

As of April 2021, there are no scheduled flights to/from Rouen Airport. Previously, Air France Hop operated summer seasonal flights to Bastia since 2017 and Figari since 2019,  which were cancelled in early 2021.

Statistics
In 2017, some 4150 passengers were handled by HOP! to Bastia and Lyon. In 2018, 17,615 passengers were carried from Rouen airport, an increase of 243% over 2017.

References

External links 
 Aéroport de Rouen - Vallée de Seine (Union des Aéroports Français) 
 
 

Airports in Normandy
Airport
Buildings and structures in Seine-Maritime
Airports established in 1991
1991 establishments in France